Seong Hui-an (Hangul: 성희안, Hanja: 成希顔; 1461 – 1513) was a Korean Joseon Dynasty politician and Neo-Confucianism Philosopher served as Chief State Councillor during the reign of King Jungjong in 1513 until his death . He was one of the coup leaders and maximum merits to become Jungjong a King .

Popular culture
 Portrayed by Lee Hwa-ryong in the 2017 KBS2 TV series Queen for Seven Days.

See also 
 Jungjong coup
 Park Won-jong
 Yu Sun-jeong

References

 Kim Haboush, JaHyun and Martina Deuchler (1999). Culture and the State in Late Chosŏn Korea.  Cambridge: Harvard University Press. ; OCLC 40926015
 Lee, Peter H. (1993). Sourcebook of Korean Civilization, Vol.  1. New York: Columbia University Press. ; ; ; OCLC 26353271

site web 
 Seong Huian 
 Seong Huian:Korean historical persons information

References 

16th-century Korean philosophers
Neo-Confucian scholars
16th-century Korean writers
Joseon scholar-officials
1461 births
1513 deaths